Jamesabad is a town in the Sindh province of Pakistan. It is located at 30°21'0N 71°50'60E with an altitude of 131 metres (433 feet). It was named after Sir Evan James, a former member of the Indian Civil Service and Commissioner of Sindh.

References

Populated places in Khanewal District